Gustav Jansson (born 24 February 1986) is a Swedish footballer who plays for Värmbols FC as a goalkeeper.

Club career
On 15 April 2020, Jansson returned to Värmbols FC.

References

External links

1986 births
Living people
Association football goalkeepers
Åtvidabergs FF players
IFK Norrköping players
Swedish footballers
Allsvenskan players
Superettan players